February 12 - Eastern Orthodox liturgical calendar - February 14

All fixed commemorations below are observed on February 26 by Eastern Orthodox Churches on the Old Calendar.

For February 13th, Orthodox Churches on the Old Calendar commemorate the Saints listed on January 31.

Saints

 Apostles and martyrs Aquila and his wife Priscilla (1st century)  (see also: July 8, July 14)
 Holy Two Martyrs, father and son, by crucifixion.
 Saint Timothy, Archbishop of Alexandria (385)
 Venerable Martinian of Caesarea in Palestine (5th century)
 Venerable Zoe of Bethlehem, and the Virgin Photini (5th century)
 Venerable Eulogius of Alexandria, Patriarch of Alexandria (608)
 Righteous Martin the Merciful.

Pre-Schism Western saints

 Martyrs Fusca and Maura, two martyrs in Ravenna under Decius (c. 250)
 Saint Julian of Lyons, a martyr venerated in Lyons in France.
 Saint Benignus of Todi, a priest in Todi in Umbria in Italy martyred under Diocletian (c. 303)
 Saint Castor of Karden, hieromonk and missionary in Germany (c. 400)
 Saint Stephen of Lyons, Bishop of Lyons in France, he was active in converting the Arian Burgundians to Orthodoxy, Confessor (512)
 Saint Modomnoc, Bishop of Ossory in Ireland (c. 550)
 Saint Stephen of Rieti, an Abbot in Rieti in Italy whom St Gregory the Great describes as 'rude of speech but of cultured life' (c. 590)
 Saint Licinius of Angers (Lezin), Bishop of Angers in France (c. 618)  (see also: November 1)
 Saint Huna of Thorney, priest-monk of Huneia (c. 690)
 Saint Dyfnog, born in Wales, he was much venerated in Clwyd (7th century)
 Saint Ermenilda of Ely (Ermengild, Ermenilda), Abbess of Ely (c. 700)
 Saint Aimo (Aimonius), founder of the convent of St Victor in Meda in the north of Italy (c. 790)
 Saint Gosbert, fourth Bishop of Osnabruck in Germany and a disciple of St Ansgar (c. 859)
 Saint Fulcran, Bishop of Lodève in Languedoc in France, famous for his asceticism, he was bishop for over half a century (1006)

Post-Schism Orthodox saints

 Venerable Symeon the Myrrh-gusher (Stefan Nemanja), Grand Prince of Serbia (1200)
 Saint Joseph of Volokolamsk, founder of Volokolamsk (Volotsk) Monastery (1515)
 Saint George Konnissky (Yurij Konissky), Archbishop of Mogilev in Belorussia (1795)
 Saint Seraphim (Sobolev), Archbishop of Bogucharsk and Wonderworker of Sofia (1950)

New martyrs and confessors

 New Hieromartyrs Basil Triumfov and Gabriel Preobrazhensky, Priests (1919)
 New Hieromartyrs Leontius Grimalsky, Archpriest, of Gzhel, Moscow, and Zosima Trubachev, Archpriest, of Maloyaroslavets (1938)
 New Hieromartyrs (1938):
 Nicholas Dobrolyubov, Basil Gorbachev, John Pokrovsky, Vladimir Pokrovsky, Parthenius Gruzinov, John Kalabukhov, John Kosinsky, Michael Popov, Priests;
 Eugene Nikolsky, Deacon;
 Virgin-martyrs Anna Korneeva, Vera Morozova and Irina Khvostova.
 Martyr Paul Sokolov;

Other commemorations

 Consecration of the Church of the Theotokos and Saint Thekla, on Mount Posaleos. 
 Translation of the relics (980 and 981) of Saint Edward the Martyr, King of England (978){{#tag:ref|Note the following historical dates and feast days:
 The first translation of the holy relics, to the church of the Most Holy Mother of God in Wareham, took place on February 13, 980.
 On February 13, 981 a great procession of clergy and laity translated the relics to Shaftesbury Abbey, arriving there seven days later, on February 20. 
 The elevation (uncovering) of the relics of St. Edward took place on June 20, 1001. 
 St. Edward was officially glorified by an act of the All-English Council of 1008, presided over by St. Alphege, Archbishop of Canterbury (who was martyred by the Danes in 1012). King Ethelred ordered that the saint's three feast days — March 18, February 13 and June 20 — should be celebrated throughout England.|group=note}}  (see also: June 20 - uncovering, and March 18 - feast)
 Icon of the Theotokos 'Dolinsky'.
 Synaxis of the Saints of Omsk. Repose of Abbess Seraphima of Sezenovo (1877)Great Synaxaristes:  Ἡ Ὁσία Σεραφείμα ἐκ Ρωσίας. 13 Φεβρουαρίου. Μεγασ Συναξαριστησ.

Icon gallery

Notes

References

Sources
 February 13 / 26. Orthodox Calendar (Pravoslavie.ru).
 February 26 / 13. Holy Trinity Russian Orthodox Church (A parish of the Patriarchate of Moscow).
 February 13. OCA - The Lives of the Saints.
 The Autonomous Orthodox Metropolia of Western Europe and the Americas. St. Hilarion Calendar of Saints for the year of our Lord 2004. St. Hilarion Press (Austin, TX). pp. 14–15.
 The Thirteenth Day of the Month of February. Orthodoxy in China.
 February 13. Latin Saints of the Orthodox Patriarchate of Rome.
 The Roman Martyrology. Transl. by the Archbishop of Baltimore. Last Edition, According to the Copy Printed at Rome in 1914. Revised Edition, with the Imprimatur of His Eminence Cardinal Gibbons. Baltimore: John Murphy Company, 1916. pp. 46–47.
 Rev. Richard Stanton. A Menology of England and Wales, or, Brief Memorials of the Ancient British and English Saints Arranged According to the Calendar, Together with the Martyrs of the 16th and 17th Centuries. London: Burns & Oates, 1892. pp. 66–68.
 Greek Sources
 Great Synaxaristes:  13 Φεβρουαριου. Μεγασ Συναξαριστησ.
  Συναξαριστής. 13 Φεβρουαρίου.'' Ecclesia.gr. (H Εκκλησια Τησ Ελλαδοσ).
 Russian Sources
  26 февраля (13 февраля). Православная Энциклопедия под редакцией Патриарха Московского и всея Руси Кирилла (электронная версия). (Orthodox Encyclopedia - Pravenc.ru).
  13 февраля по старому стилю / 26 февраля по новому стилю. СПЖ "Союз православных журналистов". 2018.

February in the Eastern Orthodox calendar